Breckenridge Brewery is an American brewing company based in Littleton, Colorado. Select beers can be found in 42 US states. The company was purchased by Anheuser-Busch InBev in 2016.

History

Founding
Breckenridge Brewery was founded in Breckenridge, Colorado, by Richard Squire in 1990. It was Colorado's third craft brewery. In 1991, Squire brought on Todd Usry, who took over as brewmaster in 1994. Usry became director of production and sales in 2008, and was ultimately named the company's president.

Expansion
In 1992, the brewery expanded operations beyond Breckenridge, opening a manufacturing facility in Denver adjacent to what would become Coors Field, home of the Colorado Rockies. In 1996, Breckenridge moved the brewing, kegging and bottling of its beer to a new facility south of downtown. The original Denver location, Breck on Blake, remains open, with brewing no longer taking place there. In 2010, Wynkoop announced a merger with Breckenridge to form the holding company Breckenridge-Wynkoop LLC. The company also owns the Wynkoop Brewing Company, Phantom Canyon Brewing, and several restaurants. In January 2013, Breckenridge Brewery announced that its facility, by then producing 64,000 barrels of beer per year, was at max capacity and would be moving to a new brewery complex. In June 2015, Breckenridge Brewery left Denver and moved into its new $36 million, 12-acre, 85,000-square-foot campus in Littleton, Colorado, which includes three buildings: a brewhouse and office building, a building for fermentation and packaging, and its 300-seat Farm House restaurant and beer garden.

Breckenridge Brewery ranked #50 on the Brewers Association's 2014 list of the largest US craft breweries, and #47 on the 2015 list. The Brewers Association ranked Breckenridge Brewery as Colorado's fifth-largest craft brewer by barrels produced in 2015. Early on, Breckenridge Brewery produced roughly 1,000 barrels of beer per year. By 2015, the company was producing over 70,000 barrels of beer, with its beers sold in 35 states in the US.

Purchase by Anheuser-Busch InBev
On December 22, 2015, Anheuser-Busch InBev announced its intent to purchase Breckenridge Brewery from Breckenridge-Wynkoop LLC, as part of its High End craft and import beer brand unit. The acquisition, completed in 2016, included Breckenridge Brewery's production brewery and Farm House restaurant in Littleton, as well as its brewpub in Breckenridge. In an open letter to Breckenridge Brewery consumers, Usry said the brewery would continue to make its own decisions regarding the beer it creates.

Partnerships
Every year since the inaugural 2012 Denver Comic Con, Breckenridge Brewery has collaborated with the convention to brew and sell a limited edition beer, with a comic-themed name chosen through an annual contest.

Since 2013, Breckenridge Brewery has regularly collaborated with Never Summer Industries for the creation of limited edition Artist Series snowboards and special release beers.

List of beers brewed

References

External links
Official website

American beer brands
Beer brewing companies based in Colorado
Anheuser-Busch beer brands
AB InBev brands
American companies established in 1990
Food and drink companies established in 1990
1990 establishments in Colorado